Nelson Medina (born 1978) is an artist from Lima, Perú. Recognized early in his career, Medina has shown his works internationally in his magazine Revolutionart, which also promotes the work of independent artists and famous talents.

Artists from all around the world participate in his requests to discuss world issues. Some of the main topics covered are climate change, economic crisis, evolution, pandemics, the future of humanity, space and nature. His work is to hunt global trends and turn them into calls that generate reflection from the artists.

In this magazine he has interviewed personalities like Floria Sigismondi, Mark Miremont, Anthony Hopkins, Simone Legno, Matt Mignanelli, Skew Siskin, Jeremyville, Bogdan Zwir, Andrzej Dragan, Adhemas Batista, Joey Lawrence, Fernanda Cohen, Brian M. Viveros, Nik Ainley, Jeff Finley and many more.

References

External links
Interview with Nelson Medina for the International Magazine Symposium - Luxembourg
Nelson Medina's Revolutionart in Youth Leader Magazine
Interview with Nelson Medina in Rott Magazine - Ukraine
Interview with Nelson Medina for Asiatic Media
Interview with Nelson Medina at WhoHub (Spanish)
Interview with Nelson Medina in C.O.B.A.C. INTERNATIONAL ART MAGAZINE - Persia
Nelson Medina talks about crowdsourcing content & acting as platform
Nelson Medina in Revista Leche #24 - Argentina
Revolutionart as sponsor of Art By Chance 2010
Revolutionart as partner in ArteLaguna Prize
Revolutionart as sponsor of Annual Design Awards 2010 - presenting "Best Digital Art" Category
Nelson Medina

1978 births
Living people
People from Lima
Art directors
Peruvian artists